Zahra Eshraghi Khomeini (born 1964) is an Iranian activist and former government official who believes in feminism and human rights.

Early life and education
Eshraghi was born in 1964. She is the granddaughter of Ayatollah Khomeini. She is a philosophy graduate.

Views
Zahra Eshraghi wants the wearing of head-scarves to no longer be compulsory. She believes that: "Our (Iran's) constitution still says that the man is the boss and the woman is a loyal wife who sacrifices herself for her family. But society here has changed, especially in the last 10 years. If my grandfather were here now, I am sure he would have had very different ideas."

She also stated "The constitution my grandfather approved says that only a man can be president... We would like to change the wording from 'man' to 'anyone'. But discrimination here is not just in the constitution. As a woman, if I want to get a passport to leave the country, have surgery, even to breathe almost, I must have permission from my husband."

Personal life
In 1983, Eshraghi married Mohammad-Reza Khatami, former head of the Islamic Iran Participation Front, the main reformist party in Iran and younger brother of former president Mohammad Khatami. They have two children, a daughter, Fatemeh, and a son, Ali.

Politics 
In 2004, Eshraghi was blocked from running for parliament by the Guardian council, which vets the parliamentary candidates.

See also
 Women in Iran

References

External links
 Interview with Zahra Eshraghi, The New York Times, 2003

1964 births
Living people
Iranian human rights activists
Iranian feminists
Iranian women's rights activists
Iranian women activists
Ruhollah Khomeini